Jonathan Chapman (January 23, 1807 – May 25, 1848) was an American politician, serving as the eighth mayor of Boston, Massachusetts from 1840 to 1842.

Chapman's father also named Jonathan Chapman served as a member of the Town of Boston's Board of Selectmen.

Chapman attended Phillips Exeter Academy and he graduated from Harvard College and studied law under the direction of Judge Lemuel Shaw.

Chapman was elected mayor in December 1839; he was sworn into office in 1840; he served three one-year terms.

Because of a large increase of the debt of the city of Boston in the 18 years since it was incorporated, Mayor Chapman had as a chief aim of his administration the reduction of the city's debt.

New City Hall

Although land had been purchased for a new city hall, Mayor Chapman did not favor that project.  Because Suffolk County was constructing a new building for the Registry and Probate offices, and was going to move out of the old courthouse building, Chapman instead recommended that the old Suffolk County Courthouse be remodeled for use as Boston's city hall.

The City occupied the renovated structure on March 18, 1841.

Steamship Service
Chapman spoke of the great importance of the establishment of the Cunard Lines  steamship   service between Boston and Liverpool, England.

The Western Railroad
Chapman also spoke of the great importance of the opening up of the Western Railroad from Boston to the Hudson River.

See also
 Timeline of Boston, 1830s–1840s

References
 Image from Mayors of Boston: An Illustrated Epitome of who the Mayors Have Been and What they Have Done, Boston, MA: State Street Trust Company, Page 16, (1914).

Notes

1807 births
1848 deaths
Phillips Academy alumni
Harvard College alumni
Mayors of Boston
Boston City Council members
19th century in Boston
Massachusetts Whigs
19th-century American politicians